Frank Merrill Caldwell (November 8, 1866 – March 8, 1937) was an American Brigadier general active during World War I.

Early life and family
Caldwell was born November 8, 1866 in Rochester, New York. He graduated from the United States Military Academy in 1890, and was commissioned in the Third Cavalry. He married Mary Hay on June 6, 1894; they were the parents of three daughters, including the actress Mary Hay.

Career
During the Spanish–American War, he served as lieutenant colonel of the 4th Wisconsin Infantry Regiment, but was removed from volunteer service in 1899. He graduated from the Army School of the Line in 1909 and from the Army Staff College in 1910. From 1916 to early 1918, he served in the Inspector General's Department.
 
On April 12, 1918, Caldwell was promoted to brigadier general. From May to October 1918, he commanded the 75th Infantry Brigade, 38th Infantry Division (AEF). This was followed by the command of the 83rd Infantry Brigade, 42nd Infantry Division, until 1919.

Caldwell returned to the Inspector General's Department again from 1920 to 1921. Following that, he was Chief of Staff of the Sixth Corps Area, serving this post from 1921 to 1924. During 1926 to 1927, Caldwell commanded the harbor defenses of the Philippines. His last command was the harbor defenses of the Pacific coast which lasted until November 30, 1931, which was when he retired.

Death
Caldwell died at the age of seventy-seven on March 8, 1937, in San Francisco, California.

References

Bibliography
Davis, Henry Blaine. Generals in Khaki. Raleigh, NC: Pentland Press, 1998.  
Marquis Who's Who, Inc. Who Was Who in American History, the Military. Chicago: Marquis Who's Who, 1975.

External links

1866 births
1937 deaths
United States Army generals of World War I
Military personnel from Rochester, New York
United States Military Academy alumni
Military personnel from Wisconsin
United States Army generals
United States Army War College alumni
American military personnel of the Spanish–American War
United States Army Command and General Staff College alumni
Burials in Wisconsin